Ricardo Andersen (born 3 March 1960) is an Argentine judoka. He competed in the men's heavyweight event at the 1984 Summer Olympics.

References

External links

1960 births
Living people
Argentine male judoka
Olympic judoka of Argentina
Judoka at the 1984 Summer Olympics
Place of birth missing (living people)